Miranjani is the highest peak in Galyat Region which is located at the elevation of , in Abbottabad District of Khyber Pakhtunkhwa the Province of Pakistan.

Trek 

The Miranjani trek starts a few minutes drive away from the Governor House in Nathia Gali. The total length of the track is about 4.69 km and a net elevation of about 600 meters. Most of the path is soft dirt sparse with small rocks patches and hence is very easy to traverse with little effort. Intermediate to expert trekkers should be able to do it in 1 hour 15 mins to 2 hours. Beginners should also have no trouble and would be able to complete in 2–3 hours. The path to the peak is canopied with tall trees and is abundant in greenery. Nathia Gali, Mushkpuri Peak and Azad Kashmir are easily visible from the top. On a clear day even Nanga Parbat, the ninth highest mountain in the world, at a displacement of 166 km or a distance of more than 400 km can be seen shining with its snow clad peaks.

See also 
Galyat - of Pakistan
List of mountains in Pakistan

References

External links 
 Miranjani Trek
 Murree.com

Mountains of Khyber Pakhtunkhwa
Abbottabad District
Two-thousanders of Pakistan